Christ and the Angel is an oil on canvas painting by Moretto da Brescia, executed c. 1550, now in the Pinacoteca Tosio Martinengo in Brescia. In 1630 Bernardino Faino recorded it "in the Capella della Santissima Croce d'oro et fiamma" in Brescia's Old Cathedral. It was restored in 1914 and 1935.

References

1550 paintings
Paintings by Moretto da Brescia
Paintings in the collection of the Pinacoteca Tosio Martinengo
Paintings depicting the Passion of Jesus
Angels in art